Emma Henry (date of birth unknown – 1986) was a Filipino police officer whose exploits were the subject of two Filipino film biopics wherein she starred as herself.

Profile
Henry was arguably the first prominent female law enforcement officer in the Philippines. A police officer, she was proficient in judo and karate, sports not commonly associated with Filipino women in the early 1970s. As a police lieutenant in Laguna, she stood out in the male-dominated police force. In 1973, she was named as one of the country's "Ten Outstanding Policemen". She eventually became the first woman to be assigned as a police station commander.

Henry gained further fame after she agreed to play herself in a biopic on her life produced by Kinavesa Productions. Released in 1978, Emma Henry (Policewoman) showcased Henry's martial arts skills and was a success. A sequel, Ang Pagbabalik ni Emma Henry ("The Return of Emma Henry"), followed three years later. Henry starred in another film, Lady Cop.

Despite her modest film career, Henry never gave up her day job as a police officer. In 1986, she was shot dead while in the line of duty. At the time of her death, it was widely suspected that she had been assassinated by members of the New People's Army, which was then waging a high-profile campaign to liquidate well-known police officials.

References
 

Year of birth missing
1986 deaths
People from Laguna (province)
Filipino film actresses
Filipino female karateka
Filipino police officers
Deaths by firearm in the Philippines
People murdered in the Philippines
Filipino murder victims
20th-century Filipino women